Lennia binoevatus, the large recluse, is a species of butterfly in the family Hesperiidae. It is found in Ghana, Nigeria, Cameroon, Gabon, the Republic of the Congo, the Central African Republic and the Democratic Republic of the Congo. The habitat consists of forests.

References

Butterflies described in 1891
Hesperiinae
Butterflies of Africa